Die beste Show der Welt ("The best show of the world") is a German television show which was first broadcast on 30 April 2016 on ProSieben. In the program, presenters Joko Winterscheidt and Klaas Heufer-Umlauf present three independent show concepts. After all six shows have been presented, the studio audience decides which show wins the title of the "best show in the world" or the "worst show in the world". Voting devices are used by the spectators. These "remote controls" can also be used for the interactive design of the show. The moderator is Jeannine Michaelsen. In the third and fourth edition, Oliver Kalkofe commented on the events and judged the respective shows.

The program is produced by Florida TV and was awarded the Deutscher Fernsehpreis in 2017.

Show concept
Joko Winterscheidt and Klaas Heufer-Umlauf present three (up to four four) shows each with a length of about 20 to 30 minutes. The presented shows are partly new show ideas, but are also based on existing TV show formats, which are slightly modified and parodied. At the same time, the two of them may force each other to participate in a show once per appointment ("Joker").

In the first four episodes, the studio audience with voting devices determined the audience for the show shown, which was the TV viewer at home live as a graphic superimposed. This graphic has been removed with episode five on 2 December 2017. Each of the 600 people in the studio could switch on or off during the show, as if sitting at home in front of the TV, using their voting device, which acts like a remote control. Over the entire running time of the show could be switched on or off as often as you like. The course of the ratings was therefore close to how good or bad the show arrived at the studio audience. This was only visible to the television viewer at home, not for the studio audience. Until the second installment of the program, a "cloud of light" consisting of white spheres fixed above the studio and illuminated with lasers was installed in the studio, which had visualized the audience rating by their brightness. The more spectators from the studio audience turned on, the brighter the cloud of light became. Since the third edition, these are no longer available. At the end of a show, their average ratings are calculated and announced. It wins the show, which could reach the highest ratings. Should the audience rate drop below 25% during a show, it will enter a "red area" (colored red on the graphic). This is now also audiovisually signaled in the studio (light turns red and the picture on the video wall in the background falls apart). If the ratings stay below 25% for more than one minute, the show must be cancelled and considered "cancelled". The generated up to that point in the audience is forfeited.

Since the fifth episode no quota is generated during the show. Instead, viewers in the audience at the end of the show choose the show they like best from all six concepts presented. It also "The worst show in the world" is determined.

Joko or Klaas won a trophy for the "Best Show in the World", the German Television Award in an oversized version (referred to in the show as the "German Television Prize in XXL") as a parody of the real German Television Award.

Broadcasts

References

2016 German television series debuts
ProSieben original programming
German-language television shows